is a Japanese manga artist. In 1981 he was worked as an assistant to Motoka Murakami, and by 1988 he had won the Monthly Young Jump "Rookie of the Year" award. That same year in Shōnen Sunday, his debut serial Akai Pegasus II Sho, the sequel to his master, Motoka Murakami's 1970s Akai Pegasus series. At the beginning of his career he signed his name with kanji, and later changed it to hiragana.

Works 
(written under the name  (hiragana)
  (written by Motoka Murakami)
 
 
  (written by Kazuya Kudou)
 
 DAT 13 (written by Kaoru Shintani)
  (written by Konasu Akane)

(written under the name  (kanji)
  (written by Shinichi Ishihara)
  (written by Yasushi Matsuda)
 ODAMARI
 
  (written by Osamu Ichino)
  (written by Seiichi Tanaka)
  (written by Fuyuki Shindou)
  (written by Yasushi Matsuda)
  (written by Yukio Kiyasu)
  (written by Sho Narumi)

External links
Kiyokazu Chiba at PRISMS 
Mari no Emono

1961 births
Living people
Manga artists from Fukuoka Prefecture